The 2019 Indian general election were held in India on 11 April 2019 to constitute the 17th Lok Sabha.

Candidates 
Major election candidates are:

Results

Assembly segments wise lead of parties

References 

Arunachal Pradesh
Indian general elections in Arunachal Pradesh
2010s in Arunachal Pradesh